The Lairdsville Covered Bridge is a wooden covered bridge over Little Muncy Creek in Moreland Township, Lycoming County, Pennsylvania in the U.S. state of Pennsylvania. It was built in 1888 and placed on the National Register of Historic Places in 1980.

See also
List of bridges on the National Register of Historic Places in Pennsylvania

References

External links

Covered bridges in Lycoming County, Pennsylvania
Bridges completed in 1888
Covered bridges on the National Register of Historic Places in Pennsylvania
Wooden bridges in Pennsylvania
Bridges in Lycoming County, Pennsylvania
Tourist attractions in Lycoming County, Pennsylvania
National Register of Historic Places in Lycoming County, Pennsylvania
Road bridges on the National Register of Historic Places in Pennsylvania
Burr Truss bridges in the United States
1888 establishments in Pennsylvania